Tekantó Municipality (In the Yucatec Maya Language: “Place where there is yellow flint”) is a small (47.25 km²) municipality in the Mexican state of Yucatán. The municipality was formed in 1900 and its municipal seat is the homonymous locality of Tekantó, at the end of highway 80, 54 km east of Merida.

Borders
The municipalities that surround Tekantó Municipality are to the north: Suma and Teya, to the south: Izamal, to the east: Tepakán and to the west: Bokobá.

Shield
In 1990 the Mexican federal government asked all the municipalities to have their own shield or coat of arms.
The City council then presided over by C. Manuel González Towers, decided to hold a contest to produce the shield's design. The design was adapted from submissions by several people. Some notable features of the shield are as follows. A sun with  13 rays that indicate the Mayan supraworld. An illustration of the Mayan chief Ah Kin Chel on a green background. Gold background with henequen that has 9 blades, that means the Mayan infraworld, the color gold has economic importance. At either side two branches interlaced by a plant called Kantó and that some say gave rise to the name of the town. At the bottom of the shield in front of the branches is a tape of silver with the words Siyan Kán Tekantó, this means the illustrious or famous Tekantó.

Population
The population of Tekantó is approximately 4,000. In the year 2000 the census record showed that 1,655 people spoke the indigenous language, Yucatec Maya. This is consistent with the state average which was 30% in 2000.

Communities
The municipality is made up from four principle communities, the municipal seat Tekantó along with its neighboring communities Tixkochoh , San Francisco Dzon  and Sanlatah ). Their populations are as follows: Tekantó 3224, Tixkochoh 455, San Francisco Dzon 127, Sanlatah 83; the census also included 53 people living outside of these communities, either in isolated rural homes or small communities like the hamlet of San Diego Rodriguez . In 2005 there were 942 houses in the municipality.

Nearby cities
The distances from the municipal seat to nearby cities are as follows:

Tekantó's rail station is on the (now disused) rail line that runs between Mérida and Valladolid via Izamal.

Climate and Ecosystems

Climate
Warm, with rains during the early summer followed by droughts during the late summer. The annual average temperature is of 26.5 °C and the annual average rainfall is 50 millimeters. The winds are predominantly from the northeast. Relative humidity Annual Average, March 66% - December 89%. The Rainy Season is May through July.

Flora and fauna
Small portions of non-evergreen low forest with secondary vegetation in the ends northeast and the northwest. Including: poppy, bojom, ceiba, chehem, chichibé, pochote and flamboyán.
The common animal species that are found in the area include: rabbit, raccoon, deer, armadillo, various snakes, iguanas and turtles; birds: dove, tzutzuy, quail and tórtola.

Places of interest and tourism

Architectural
San Augustin Tekantó is an impressive building and one of the largest churches in the Yucatán outside of Merida; it was an important early Franciscan Convent in this region.

 

The original mission dates from 1567. According to an inscription on the facade, the church was completed in 1688, over a hundred years after the mission's founding.
Near to Tekantó are the hamlets of the ex-properties: Sanlatah and San Francisco Dzon.

Popular celebrations
From 26 to 28 August an annual fiesta is held in honor of the patron saint of Tekantó, San Augustin.

Between 15 and 26 November, an annual fair is held to celebrate Santo Christo de Citilcún. On November 15 each year a procession brings Santo Christo de Citilcún to Tekantó, after the procession there are firework displays and food for sale in the town square. Towards the end of the month there are various festivities including folk dancing, hosted at the town hall; an impromptu bullfighting ring is set up to host bull fights and other events.

Surrounding area
The ruins of Ake are 20 km to the south west of the locality of Tekanto, and Izamal with its world-famous monastery, Victorian era carriages, and mesoamerican pyramids is only 13 km to the south east.

History
 Before the Spanish conquest of Yucatán the region of Tekantó was part of the chieftainship of Ah Kin Chel (1441–1543).
 1546:  The Spanish conquest of Yucatán that started in 1526 is considered complete.
 1567: Franciscan Mission founded in Tekantó.
 1581: Cristobal Sanchez inherits both Tekantó and Tepakan under the encomienda system from his father, the famous conquistador Don Diego Sanchez.
 1688: Construction of the convent and mission of San Augustin Tekantó is completed.
 1700: Antonia Pacheco and Juan N. Calderón are responsible for Tekantó under the encomienda system.
 1720: The legality of the Encomienda system is ended and is succeeded by the Hacienda system in which laborers were directly employed by the hacienda owners (Sanlatah is a Hacienda in Tekantó municipality).
 1821: Yucatán declares itself independent of Spain.
 1825: During this time Tekantó was in the partido of La Costa, which had Izamal as its capital. (At this time Yucatán was divided up onto 15 partidos or subdelegaciones, and Yucatán then included what is now Campeche).
 1848: On May 28 during the Caste War of Yucatán after a 6-day siege Colonel Bello led his force of 1,000 men out of Izamal taking a back trail to Tekantó. From Tekantó he watched Izamal burn.
 1900: Tekantó Municipality is created and Tekantó becomes its own municipality seat.

Economy
 
Tekantó is a municipality that is located in the North central zone of Yucatán that is part of the denominated henequen zone, where the main agricultural crop is agave. Along with the surrounding municipalities the major productive activity for many years, until the end of the 20th Century, was the henequen industry.

With the decline of the henequen industry, a process of economic diversification occurred in Tekantó. Today in this area maize is main crop, along with kidney beans, various vegetables, watermelon and some varieties of chili peppers. In addition to these crops, pigs and poultry are farmed. Beekeeping is also common in the area.

Photo gallery

Notables
Notable locals include Marrufo Cetina, Carlos Anastasio. Mandolinista and musical composer (1875–1932).

Education
Number of schools by educative level, to the year 2000, according to the Statistical Yearbook of the State of Yucatán, published by the INEGI:

See also
 Municipalities of Yucatán.

Notes
Spelling of Mayan Names:

The spelling of Mayan names (family names, place names and others) will often vary from document to document, for this page the spellings used on the municipality web site have been adopted as the standard. Another recommended standard for place names is the SCT (Secretaria de Comunicaciones y Transportes) spelling, as this would then match any road signs. As there are more references to the municipality web site, the SCT spellings are not used throughout the page, but included below for reference.

San Francisco Dzon is also known as  San Francisco Tzon (INEGI) and San Francisco Izun (SCT)

Sanlatah is also known as  Sanlatá (SCT).

References

Municipalities of Yucatán
Tourism in Mexico